Nancy Karr (also Pollock) is a fictional character on the long-running daytime soap opera, The Edge of Night. The role was played by actress Ann Flood for 22 years from 1962 to 1984, until the series ended.

Performer
Nancy was portrayed by Ann Flood from 1962 to 1984, until The Edge of Night was cancelled. At the show's conclusion, she was the longest-serving cast member. Flood was twice nominated for a Daytime Emmy Award for Outstanding Lead Actress in a Drama Series, in 1982 and 1984.

Characterization
Nancy was the daughter of Joe and Rose Pollock, and was a newspaper reporter for the periodical in the fictional midwestern town of Monticello. She also had two siblings, Lee, who was married to Gerry McGrath; and Elaine, called Cookie. She had met and fell in love with widower Mike Karr, a lawyer who had lost his first wife, Sara Lane, to a terrible accident. They married in 1963. Nancy proved herself to be a wonderful stepmother to his daughter, Laurie Ann, and in 1963, married Mike. The two were very much in love and were married through the series ended in 1984.  During that time, she and Mike also adopted Timmy Faraday after the death of his father, and the arrest and imprisonment of his mother, Serena. She is also a grandmother to John Victor Dallas, the son of Laurie Ann and her husband.

References

External links 
 

Fictional reporters
The Edge of Night characters
Television characters introduced in 1962